Bai Qi (– 257 BC), also known as Gongsun Qi, was a Chinese military general of the Qin state during the Warring States period. Born in Mei (present-day Mei County, Shaanxi), Bai Qi served as the commander of the Qin army for more than 30 years, being responsible for the deaths of over one million, earning him the nickname . According to the Shiji, he seized more than 73 cities from the other six hostile states, and to date no record has been found to show that he suffered a single defeat throughout his military career. He was named by Chinese historians as one of the four greatest generals of the late Warring States period, along with Li Mu, Wang Jian, and Lian Po; he is also remembered as the most fearsome amongst the four.

Life

In 293 BC, Bai Qi led the Qin army to victory against Wei and Han forces at the Battle of Yique (in present-day Longmen, southeast of Luoyang, Henan), reportedly slaughtering around 240,000 enemy soldiers in total while capturing some cities.

In 292 BC, he was promoted from Zuo Shu Zhang (左庶長; Vice Prime Minister of Qin) to Da Liang Zao (大良造; Prime Minister of Qin) by King Zhaoxiang of Qin.

In 278 BC, he led the Qin army to capture Ying, the capital city of Chu, in the process seizing considerable amounts of territory. As a reward, he was given the title Lord Wu'an (武安君; literally: Lord of Martial Peace). Reportedly drowning 100,000 people in a flood attack.

In 273 BC, the Qin army under his command defeated the joint armies of Zhao and Wei at Huayang (華陽; south of present-day Zhengzhou, Henan), where he massacred the submitting soldiers, reportedly numbering around 150,000 troops in total: 130,000 Wei soldiers with a further 20,000 Zhao soldiers being killed and thrown into a river.

In 264 BC, he successfully besieged 5 Han fortresses and thereafter decapitated the 50,000 enemy soldiers.

During the Battle of Changping in 260 BC, he succeeded Wang He as the commander of the Qin army, and soon defeated the Zhao army commanded by the inexperienced Zhao Kuo, who himself had replaced Lian Po as acting commander. The Zhao army was split into two parts and its supply lines and retreat route cut off by Bai Qi. More than 400,000 Zhao soldiers, including the Shangdang people who surrendered after Zhao Kuo was shot dead by Qin archers, were slain (坑殺; buried alive) on the orders of Bai Qi.

Bai Qi wanted to end Zhao once and for all, as they were weary and psychologically affected by the losses incurred from the Battle of Changping, but the prime minister of Qin, Fan Ju, who was persuaded by a talker from Zhao, feared Bai Qi's rising power, and recommended that the king stop the attack on the pretext that the Qin troops ought to be rested, and to accept a ceded territory negotiation. Bai Qi stopped the attack; on his return journey to the State of Qin, he fell ill.

According to the Shiji, in the year 257 BC, Qin started to besiege Handan, the capital of Zhao. Because Bai Qi was ill, the Qin king used another prominent general, Wang Ling, who subsequently lost the battle. After about four months, when Bai Qi seemed to have recovered, the king asked him to return to his post as commander, but Bai Qi held a different opinion, he argued that Qin no longer had enough resources for such a long-range war, and the other states would soon attack Qin since Qin had been contrary to the negotiation. However, the king insisted on continuing the attack. Bai Qi refused the king's command, using his illness as an excuse. The king, therefore, had to use Wang He, another prominent Qin general, instead of Bai Qi, as the commander.

This decision did not help the Qin army in the battle at all; Chu and Wei soon sent troops to assist Zhao. After more than five months of continuous defeat at Handan, Qin had suffered major losses. The king asked Bai Qi to become commander again, but he once more used his illness to refuse the request. In the Zhan Guo Ce, his true intentions were supposedly revealed when he stated that he would rather be executed for refusing the king's order, than lose his long undefeated fame on the battlefield. Having been refused several times, the king became angry, removed all titles from Bai Qi, and forced him to leave Xianyang, the Qin capital. In addition, Fan Ju persuaded the king that Bai Qi would join another state as a general and become a threat to the State of Qin. Convinced by Fan Ju's information, the king then forced Bai Qi to commit suicide in Duyou. Before he committed suicide, Bai Qi stated that he deserved such a tragic ending after having killed so many people.

Legacy
Bai Qi sometimes appears as a door god on Chinese and Taoist temples, usually paired with Li Mu.

He is noted in Chinese history as a symbol of brutality rather than for his military talent. The traditional Tofu dish of Gaoping, today's Changping, called Bai Qi meat, is well known. Some stories have been written about Bai Qi suffering for his brutal actions, such as one mentioned in the Chronicles of the Eastern Zhou Kingdoms, which says that an ox with two Chinese characters, 'Bai Qi', tattooed on its back, was executed by lightning during the Tang Dynasty.

Human remains used to and still continue to be found at the site of the Battle of Changping around Gaoping. The Emperor Xuanzong of Tang once decided to dedicate a temple over a collection of the remains there.

In popular culture
Bai Qi is played by Sun Ting in the 2012 television series The Qin Empire II: Alliance and by Xing Jiadong in its 2017 sequel The Qin Empire III.
Bai Qi, also known by the Japanese reading of his name, "Haku Ki", was the leader of the former generation of the "Qin Six Great Generals" in the manga series Kingdom. He was one of the best tacticians of his era and one of the most feared Generals in China, he personally led the infamous Battle of Changping, and under his cold gaze, executed and buried alive 450,000 Zhao soldiers.
Bai Qi is one of the 32 historical figures who appear as special characters in the video game Romance of the Three Kingdoms XI by Koei. He has the highest military leadership statistics of all the characters, tied only to Han Xin.

See also
King Zhaoxiang of Qin
Lament for Ying
Li Mu
Lian Po
Records of the Grand Historian
Sima Qian 
Wang Jian
Zhao Kuo

References

Citations

Bibliography
Hawkes, David, translator and introduction (2011 [1985]). Qu Yuan et al., The Songs of the South: An Ancient Chinese Anthology of Poems by Qu Yuan and Other Poets. London: Penguin Books.

Further reference
  西漢, 司馬遷.史記 卷七十三 白起王翦列傳(Western Han Dynasty, Sima Qian, Biography of Wang Jian and Bai Qi, Volume 73 of Records of the Grand Historian (Shiji))
  清, 蔡元放. 東周列國志(Qing dynasty, Cai Yuanfang. Records of the states during the Eastern Zhou Dynasty)

External links

  Bai Qi Time Line

257 BC deaths
3rd-century BC executions
Ancient people who committed suicide
Chinese gods
Deified Chinese people
Executed Qin dynasty people
Forced suicides of Chinese people
Generals from Shaanxi
People executed by the Qin dynasty
People from Baoji
Qin dynasty generals
Suicides by sharp instrument in China
Suicides in China
Year of birth unknown
Zhou dynasty generals
Qin state people